Pirro Colonna (1500 – November 1552) was an Italian military leader in the service of Charles V during the Italian War of 1542.  He commanded the garrison of Carignano during the French sieges of the city before and after the Battle of Ceresole.

References

 Oman, Charles. A History of the Art of War in the Sixteenth Century.  London: Methuen & Co., 1937.

1500 births
1552 deaths
Pierro
16th-century condottieri
16th-century Italian nobility
Military leaders of the Italian Wars